An election of the delegation from West Germany to the first directly elected European Parliament was held in 1979.

Results
West Berlin, due to its special status, was ineligible to participate in the election. Instead, the city legislature indirectly elected three members:

References

 Archivo electoral de la Generalidad Valenciana

West Germany
European Parliament elections in Germany
1979 elections in Germany